Prestebakke is a village in the municipality of Halden in Østfold county, Norway.

Climate
Prestebakke has a subarctic climate (Dfc).

References

Halden
Villages in Østfold